Cyclobacterium jeungdonense  is a horseshoe-shaped bacterium from the genus of Cyclobacterium which has been in Korea.

References 

Cytophagia
Bacteria described in 2014